Anna Olin (born Anna Margareta Kristina Steckmeister; 19 June 1881 – 27 May 1946) was a Swedish stage and film actress. She was married to the Swedish actor and theatre director Vilhelm Olin.

Selected filmography
 Johan Ulfstjerna (1923)
 The Storholmen Brothers (1932)
 Servant's Entrance (1932)
 Jolly Musicians (1932)
 What Do Men Know? (1933)
 Fired (1934)
 Andersson's Kalle (1934)
 Eva Goes Aboard (1934)
 The Marriage Game (1935)
 Raggen (1936)
 Poor Millionaires (1936)
 The Pale Count (1937)
 Her Little Majesty (1939)
 The Brothers' Woman (1943)
 Man's Woman (1945)
 Idel ädel adel (1945)
 Åsa-Hanna (1946)
 The Wedding on Solö (1946)

References

Bibliography
 Goble, Alan. The Complete Index to Literary Sources in Film. Walter de Gruyter, 1999.

External links

1881 births
1946 deaths
Swedish stage actresses
Swedish film actresses
Swedish silent film actresses
Actresses from Stockholm